This is the list of international prime ministerial trips made by Rishi Sunak, who has served as the 57th Prime Minister of the United Kingdom from 25 October 2022. Rishi Sunak has made seven international trips to eight countries during his premiership.

Summary
The number of visits per country where Prime Minister Sunak travelled are:
 One: Egypt, Estonia, France, Germany, Indonesia, Latvia, Ukraine, and the United States.

2022

2023

Future trips

The following international trips are scheduled to be made by Sunak:

Multilateral meetings

Sunak is scheduled to attend the following summits during his prime ministership:

See also 
 Foreign relations of the United Kingdom 
 List of international trips made by prime ministers of the United Kingdom
 List of international prime ministerial trips made by Boris Johnson
 List of international prime ministerial trips made by Theresa May
 List of international prime ministerial trips made by David Cameron

References 

International prime ministerial trips
2022 in international relations
State visits by British leaders
Foreign relations of the United Kingdom
United Kingdom diplomacy-related lists
Lists of diplomatic visits by heads of state
British prime ministerial visits
21st century in international relations
Diplomatic visits by heads of government